Catalan may refer to:

Catalonia
From, or related to Catalonia:
 Catalan language, a Romance language
 Catalans, an ethnic group formed by the people from, or with origins in, Northern or southern Catalonia

Places
 13178 Catalan, asteroid #13178, named "Catalan"
 Catalán (crater), a lunar crater named for Miguel Ángel Catalán
 Çatalan, İvrindi, a village in Balıkesir province, Turkey
 Çatalan, Karaisalı, a village in Adana Province, Turkey
 Catalan Bay, Gibraltar
 Catalan Sea, more commonly known as the Balearic Sea
 Catalan Mediterranean System, the Catalan Mountains

Facilities and structures
 Çatalan Bridge, Adana, Turkey
 Çatalan Dam, Adana, Turkey
 Catalan Batteries, Gibraltar

People
 Catalan, Lord of Monaco (1415–1457), Lord of Monaco from 1454 until 1457
 Alfredo Catalán (born 1968), Venezuelan politician
 Alex Catalán (born 1968), Spanish filmmaker
 Arnaut Catalan (1219–1253), troubador
 Diego Catalán (1928–2008), Spanish philologist
 Emilio Arenales Catalán (1922–1969) Guatemalan politician
 Eugène Charles Catalan (1814–1894), French and Belgian mathematician
 Miguel A. Catalán (1894–1957), Spanish spectroscopist
 Moses Chayyim Catalan (died 1661), Italian rabbi
 Sergio Catalán (born 1991) Chilean soccer player

Mathematics
Mathematical concepts named after mathematician Eugène Catalan:
 Catalan numbers, a sequence of natural numbers that occur in various counting problems
 Catalan solids, a family of polyhedra
 Catalan's constant, a number that occurs in estimates in combinatorics
 Catalan's conjecture

Wine
 Catalan (grape), another name for the wine grape Mourvèdre
 Catalan wine, an alternative name used in France for wine made from the Carignan grape
 Carignan, a wine grape that is also known as Catalan

Sports and games
 Catalan Opening, in chess
 Catalan Open, golf tournament
 Catalans Dragons, a rugby league team often known simply as Catalan
 XIII Catalan, a rugby league team from Perpignan, France

Other uses
 Battle of Catalán (1817) in Uruguay 
 Catalan Sheepdog
 Catalan Company, medieval mercenary company
 Catalan vault, architectural design element
 The Catalans, a 1953 novel by Patrick O'Brian

See also

 

Catalonia (disambiguation)
Catalunya (disambiguation)
 Catalan exonyms
 Anti-Catalanism

Language and nationality disambiguation pages
Ethnonymic surnames